God Is Partying is the sixth studio album by American hard rock musician Andrew W.K., released on September 10, 2021 through Napalm Records.

The album's release was announced on May 6, 2021, along with its second single, "I'm in Heaven". That single was accompanied by a music video directed by Phem C. Palmer. The first single, "Babalon", was released in February 2021.

Andrew W.K. played all instruments on the album, which is co-produced by Ted Young.

Reception 

At Metacritic, which assigns a weighted average rating out of 100 to reviews from mainstream publications, the release received an average score of 76, based on eight reviews, which equates to "generally favorable reviews".

Track listing

Charts

References

Andrew W.K. albums
2021 albums
Napalm Records albums